The 1993 Shell Helix Ultra season was the 9th season of the franchise in the Philippine Basketball Association (PBA). Known as Shell Rimula-X in the All-Filipino Cup.

Draft picks

Occurrences
Before the start of the season, Shell's main man Benjie Paras wanted out of his contract and signified his intentions to join his team's arch rival Ginebra San Miguel. The Shell management declined Ginebra's offer of two trade options. As it turn out, Paras skip the whole All-Filipino Cup tournament and the team suffered without their top center. The Turbo Chargers finish last by winning only two out of their 10 games in the eliminations.

After holding out for six months, Benjie Paras finally decided to signed up with Shell and played his first game in the second conference.

Forward Ricky Relosa was suspended for the rest of the conference during the Commissioner's Cup when on the July 25 Shell-Swift encounter, he punched Swift import Ronnie Thompkins on the nape which provoked Thompkins and he chase Relosa all the way to the Shell bench and a brawl ensued.

Notable dates
June 13: Seven-time best import Bobby Parks was back anew as Shell opened their title-retention bid with an 85-84 squeaker past Seven-Up. Benjie Paras canned two free throws that gave Shell an 85-82 cushion with time down to 12.6 seconds.  

June 18: Shell Helix romped to a 98-89 win over Ginebra as the dreaded trio of Parks, Paras and Magsanoc combined for 56 points. The Oilers starved off the Gins' late-game rally for their second win in the Commissioner's Cup.

Roster

Transactions

Short-term contracts

Additions

Recruited imports

References

Shell Turbo Chargers seasons
Shell